Argyresthia quadristrigella is a moth of the  family Yponomeutidae. It is found in North America, including Ohio, Oklahoma and Texas.

The wingspan is about 10 mm. The forewings are golden white with the base, tip, and four nearly straight edged transverse fascia dark golden yellow. The hindwings are light gray.

The larvae feed on Juniperus virginiana.

References

Moths described in 1873
Argyresthia
Moths of North America